The Minnaert resonance is a phenomenon associated with a gas bubble pulsating at its natural frequency in a liquid, neglecting the effects of surface tension and viscous attenuation. It is the frequency of the sound made by a drop of water from a tap falling in water underneath, trapping a bubble of air as it falls. The natural frequency of the entrapped air bubble in the water is given by

For a single bubble in water at standard pressure , this equation reduces to
, 
where  is the natural frequency of the bubble. The Minnaert formula assumes an ideal gas, however it can be easily modified to account for deviations from real gas behavior by accounting for the gas compressibility factor, or the gas bulk modulus 

 and  being respectively the density and the speed of sound in the bubble.

References

External link 
 Low-Frequency Resonant Scattering of Bubble Clouds by Paul A. Hwang and William J. Teague, 2000, Journal of Atmospheric and Oceanic Technology, vol. 17, no. 6, pp. 847-853. journals.ametsoc.org

Sound
Bubbles (physics)